Marc Schneider (born 23 July 1980) is a Swiss professional football manager and former player, who played as defender.

Playing career
Schneider was captain of the Swiss title-winning team of 2005–06 and part of the 2006–07 Swiss Championship winning team of FC Zürich. During his last spell at Zürich, he normally played at left back, with players such as Steve von Bergen and Hannu Tihinen preferred in the middle. After leaving the club, however, he moved back to his original position in the centre of defence.

Managerial career
After his active career, Schneider stepped into the coaching profession and replaced Ciriaco Sforza as Thun's caretaker manager on 1 July 2015. He was in turn succeeded by Luxembourger Jeff Saibene. In 2017, he was reappointed as head coach of Thun. In December 2020, the club decided to dismiss him from his duties.

In June 2021, recently relegated Belgian First Division B club Waasland-Beveren announced that they had appointed Schneider as their new head coach, succeeding Nicky Hayen, who had not been able to keep the club at the highest level. He moved to manage Greuther Fürth in May 2022. He was sacked in October 2022.

Honours
FC Zürich
Swiss Cup: 2004–05
Super League/Nationalliga A: 2005–06, 2006–07

References

External links

1980 births
Living people
People from Thun
Association football defenders
Swiss men's footballers
FC Zürich players
BSC Young Boys players
FC St. Gallen players
FC Thun players
S.K. Beveren managers
SpVgg Greuther Fürth managers
Swiss Super League players
Belgian First Division B managers
2. Bundesliga managers
Expatriate football managers in Belgium
Swiss expatriate football managers
Expatriate football managers in Germany
Sportspeople from the canton of Bern